, also known as Macross: Do You Remember Love? (commonly referred to by the acronym "DYRL?" among Western fans) or Super Spacefortress Macross, is a 1984 Japanese animated space opera film based on the Macross anime television series.

The movie is a film adaptation of the original Macross series, with new animation. The storyline of the film does not fit directly into the Macross chronology, and was originally an alternate universe retelling of the story, but was later established as part of the Macross universe. Within the Macross universe, it is a popular movie (i.e. a movie within a television series), shown in Macross 7. However, later Macross productions like Macross Frontier have used elements from both the first T.V. series and this film. In Macross tradition, it features transforming mecha robots, Japanese pop music, and a love triangle. The movie gets its name from its romantic themes and also by the song sung during its climactic battle sequence by Lynn Minmay (voiced by Mari Iijima). In Macross Frontier, a later series in the Macross universe, the first few episodes use re-animated key scenes from this film and Flash Back 2012 to give viewers glimpses of past events.

Plot

The film begins in medias res with the space fortress SDF-1 Macross trying to evade the Zentradi at the edge of the Solar System. The Macross houses an entire city with tens of thousands of civilians who are cut off from Earth, after it had executed a space fold on the first day of the Earth/Zentradi war - taking the city section of South Ataria Island with it. During the latest assault, Valkyrie pilot Hikaru Ichijyo rescues pop idol Lynn Minmay, but are both trapped in a section of the fortress for days. Even after their eventual rescue, this fateful meeting leads to a relationship between the singer and her number one fan.

The Zentradi, meanwhile, discover the debilitating and disruptive effect that human music has on the rank and file troops. Their supreme leader, Gorg Boddole Zer, suspects that the human culture is deeply related to an ancient music box he has kept with him for eons. Then, the Zentradi discover an opportunity to examine the humans further when Hikaru borrows a Valkyrie trainer unit without permission and flies Minmay across Saturn's rings. The Zentradi capture Hikaru and Minmay, along with Lieutenant Misa Hayase, Minmay's cousin/manager Lynn Kaifun, and Hikaru's superior Roy Föcker in the ensuing chaos.

Aboard Britai Kridanik's ship, the humans are being interrogated about their culture when a squadron of Meltrandi, led by Milia 639, invades the ship, giving the humans a chance to escape. Hikaru and Misa escape from the ship, but Föcker is killed and Minmay and Kaifun remain aboard while the two officers get caught in a space fold.

Exiting from the fold, Hikaru and Misa arrive on a desolate world that turns out to be Earth, as the entire population was wiped out by a prior Zentradi attack. As the two officers roam the remains of the planet, they become closer. They also discover an ancient city of the Protoculture, where the mysterious origins of the alien giants is revealed. In the city, Misa discovers an artifact that contains lyrics to an ancient song.

Many days later, the Macross arrives on Earth. Just as Hikaru and Misa are debriefing their story to Captain Bruno J. Global, the fortress is attacked by a Meltrandi fleet. During the battle, ace pilot Maximilian Jenius defeats Millia aboard the Meltrandi's main ship, which destroys the Macross main cannons with one shot. The Meltrandi are forced to retreat when the Zentradi arrive - with Minmay's singing voice as their weapon.

Captain Global announces a truce and a military pact between the Macross and the Zentradi. Hikaru and Minmay reunite, but Minmay realizes he is now with Misa. Meanwhile, Misa works on translating the ancient song for use as a cultural weapon, as requested by Boddole Zer. However, when the Meltrandi return to attack, Boddole Zer loses patience and recklessly has his capital ship wipe out half the fleets of both factions.

Once again, the Macross finds itself in the middle of a brutal war. Hikaru persuades Minmay to perform the translated song. As the Macross flies across the battlefield, Minmay's song causes a union with Britai's fleet and the Meltrandi against Boddole Zer. After the Macross breaks into Boddole Zer's ship, Hikaru flies his Valkyrie into the supreme commander's chamber and destroys him with his entire arsenal. After Boddole Zer's ship is destroyed, Macross bridge officer Claudia LaSalle asks why the song caused such a turnaround to the war. Misa explains that it is a simple love song.

The film ends with a concert by Minmay in front of the rebuilt Macross.

 Cast 

 Original Japanese voices 

 Arihiro Hase as Hikaru Ichijyo
 Mari Iijima as Lynn Minmay
 Mika Doi as Misa Hayase
 Akira Kamiya as Roy Focker
 Eiji Kanie as Vrlitwhai 7018
 Eri Takeda as Milia 639
 Hiromi Tsuru as Kim Kabirov
 Hirotaka Suzuoki as Lynn Kaifunn
 Katsumi Suzuki as Hayao Kakizaki
 Michio Hazama as Capt. Bruno J. Global
 Noriko Ohara as Claudia LaSalle
 Osamu Ichikawa as Golg Boddole Zer
 Run Sasaki as Vanessa Laird
 Ryusuke Ōbayashi as Exsedol 4970
 Sanae Miyuki as Shammy Milliome
 Shō Hayami as Max Jenius
 Yoshino Ohtori as Moruk Laplamiz
 Ikuya Sawaki as Senior Statesman
 Kenyu Horiuchi as TV Reporter
 Nagisa Andō as Meltlan Soldier
 Nobuo Tobita as Waiter
 Shigeru Nakahara as Guest B
 Tomomichi Nishimura as M.C.
 Tsutomu Fujii as Loli 28356
 Jeffrey Smith as Warera 25258
 Kent Gilbert as Conda 88333
 Yoshio Kawai as Guest A
 Youko Ogai as Dewanton 3565
 Yūichi Meguro as Quamzin 03350
 Eriko Chihara
 Junko Hino
 Kosuke Tomita
 Natsumi Sasaki
 Saki Takimoto
 Sanae Mihara
 Yasushi Sugihara
 Yuriko J. Takahashi

 English dub 
 John Culkin as Hikaru Ichijyo and Max Jenius (some scenes)
 Barry Haigh as Roy Focker
 Matthew Oram as Britai 7018, Golg Boddole Zer, Max Jenius (most scenes), Quamzin 03350
 Simon Broad as Bruno J. Global, Hayao Kakizaki and Lynn Kaihun
 Elizabeth Oram as Lynn Minmay and Shammy Milliome

Production
Shoji Kawamori, Kazutaka Miyatake and Haruhiko Mikimoto worked on the mecha and character designs for the film. Narumi Kakinouchi, one of the creators of Vampire Princess Miyu, was the assistant animation director for this movie.

During one of the action scenes towards the end of the movie, Hikaru fires a barrage of missiles on his way to Boddole Zer. As an inside joke among the animators, two of the missiles are drawn to look like cans of Budweiser and Tako Hai (a drink which literally translates as "Octopus Highball").

It was the second most expensive anime film up until then, after Hayao Miyazaki's Lupin III: The Castle of Cagliostro (1979).

Music
The film's soundtrack was composed by Kentaro Haneda, featuring new orchestral tracks and some music from the original TV series. The theme song "Ai Oboete Imasu ka" ("Do You Remember Love") was composed by Kazuhiko Katō and performed by Mari Iijima. The ending theme "Tenshi no Enogu" ("An Angel's Paints") was composed and performed by Iijima.

Release
The film premiered in Japanese theaters on July 7, 1984. It received a huge marketing campaign that generated very long lines of fans; many of them camped outside cinemas the night prior to the film. These events were dramatized in the anime comedy Otaku no Video from 1991. In the 1984 edition of the Anime Grand Prix, the film was ranked second, behind Nausicaä of the Valley of the Wind. The film's theme song was also ranked first.

Box office

Relation to the TV series
Do You Remember Love? is a reinterpretation of The Super Dimension Fortress Macross in a feature film format. Almost all of the characters featured in the TV series appear in the film. Most of the voice actors from the TV series reprised their roles for the film. The love triangle and the various relationships are intact.

Macross 7 describes a film called Do You Remember Love? within the fictional world of Macross. Series creator Shoji Kawamori also gave an explanation about the differences in the television and film depictions of Space War I: "The real Macross is out there, somewhere. If I tell the story in the length of a TV series, it looks one way, and if I tell it as a movie-length story, it's organized another way...".

Many ships, mecha, and characters were redesigned for the film. These designs have been featured in later entries of the Macross franchise. The Zentradi were given a language of their own and most of the dialogue of Zentradi characters is in that language.

The Zentradi males and females are named Zentran and Meltran and placed on opposite sides of the Protoculture conflict. No mention is made of the Supervision Army. The Meltlandi, in addition to being in a separate fleet of their own have distinctive ship and mecha designs.
In the original Macross TV series, the Zentradi's dialogue was automatically translated into Japanese. In this animated film, they are actually heard speaking a fictional extraterrestrial language specifically developed for the movie as subtitles are provided for the audience, much like the Klingon language in Star Trek (of which a word wasn't spoken until they both appeared in their first theatrical version). This language was subsequently used in further installations of the Macross universe.
The Macross is designed slightly differently and instead of having the Daedalus and Prometheus docked as its 'arms' it has two ARMD carriers. This became the design of the Macross on further series installments such as Macross II, Macross Plus and Macross Frontier.
The origin of the SDF-1 Macross is also different. Instead of being a Supervision Army Gun Destroyer like in the TV series, in the Do You Remember Love? film the SDF-1 was originally a Meltlandi Gun Destroyer that crashed on Earth and was reconstructed by humans. The Zentradi attack Earth as soon as they discover the ship which apparently belongs to their Meltlandi enemies.
Zentradi Supreme Leader Gorg Boddole Zer's physical appearance in the film completely differs from that in the TV series. Instead of being merely a bald Zentran, his head is cybernetically fused with his mobile space fortress. Also, Boddole Zer towers incredibly high above the Zentradi in comparison to the TV series where he was slightly taller than Britai Kridanik.

International versions
According to Carl Macek, when asked by Cannon Films to produce a film version of Robotech, he mentioned he was interested in dubbing and localizing Do You Remember Love? with the voice cast from the series, but Harmony Gold USA was unable to license the film for "political reasons." Megazone 23 Part 1 was used instead.

Originally, two versions of a Toho-commissioned dub had been released in the United States throughout the late 1980s and early 1990s. The Toho dub (named Super Spacefortress Macross in Japan) had been created for international sales by Omni Productions. The better known of the two US releases of the dub is an edited version that was released by Celebrity Home Entertainment's "Just for Kids" label in the late 1980s, renamed Clash of the Bionoids'''. It has been heavily criticized by fans of the film for extreme cuts – nearly thirty minutes were excised from the movie. In particular, the ending was heavily modified from the original Japanese version: the scene with Hikaru calling the Macross after Boddole Zer's explosion was removed, giving the false impression that Hikaru died in the blast. Later, a subtitled version was briefly released before, presumably, it was suppressed due to the ongoing legal battles between Big West/Studio Nue, Tatsunoko and Harmony Gold. Robert Woodhead, head of AnimEigo, has said publicly that he would like to release the film (AnimEigo released the first pressings of the Macross series in the US), but believes it will most likely never get a proper DVD release in the United States due to the legal disputes surrounding the film. The movie was released in widescreen in both dubbed and subtitled format by Kiseki Films in the UK on video in the 1990s, but was notably one of their few catalog titles not being released on DVD.

Re-released in the 2000s on DVD, a full 90-minute Swedish dub was released in the 1980s by Wendros, based on the Toho Super Spacefortress Macross version.

Video games
An arcade game titled Super Spacefortress Macross was released in 1992.
A loose game sequel called The Super Dimension Fortress Macross: Scrambled Valkyrie was released in 1993 for the Super Famicom.
A CD-based video game was released for the Sega Saturn in 1997 and the Sony PlayStation in 1999, titled Macross: Do You Remember Love?. It was a 2D shooter that followed the movie's storyline using cut scenes from the film and additional footage.
In The Super Dimension Fortress Macross PlayStation 2 video game players are able to choose either a long and easier "TV path" or the more difficult and shorter "Movie path" of the game, which is based on the events of Do You Remember Love? and also has several missions that feature situations not shown on film.
Characters of the film appear in the Super Robot Wars Alpha'' videogame, as well as two different paths to choose during gameplay (one which follows some events of the TV series, and the other which follows the events from movie). The player can use Max Jenius to try to recruit Milia Fallyna to your side in one stage, but the way their final confrontation plays out in a later stage determines whether Milia gets micronized (as in the series), or Max gets macronized (as in the movie) when she finally joins you.

References

External links
Official Macross website 

Macross: Do You Remember Love?  at Macross Compendium
Macross: Do You Remember Love? at Macross Mecha Manual

1984 anime films
Do You Remember Love?
1980s science fiction films
Animated films based on animated series
Animated post-apocalyptic films
Films set in 2009
Japanese animated science fiction films
Japanese idols in anime and manga
Space opera anime and manga
Space opera films
Tatsunoko Production
Toho animated films
Topcraft